Cephonodes rufescens is a moth of the family Sphingidae. It is known from Madagascar.

The upperside of the head, thorax and wing bases is unicolorous brown. The abdomen is reddish mixed with brown.

References

Cephonodes
Moths described in 1960
Moths of Madagascar
Moths of Africa